Ahl Al Bayt University is a private Iraqi university established in 2003 in Karbala, Iraq by Dr. Muhsin Baqir al-Qazwini.The university was first initiated as a virtual university appearing on the internet in 2000 as the Ahl Al Bayt International University, and it taught Management, Law, Arabic Literature and Islamic law. Whilst the university was virtual, it had offices in different cities like London, Beirut, Kuwait, Damascus and Manama, for students to go and take their mid-term and final exams.

After the 2003 invasion of Iraq, the founder of the university moved back to Iraq and settled in Karbala. Over there he established the university with the Ministry of Higher Education, and it gained the agreement from the minister Dr. Abdul Razzaq al-Aswad in 2004.

The university started with three colleges: College of Law, Islamic Sciences, Arts. In 2007, Dr. al-Qazwini purchased a 7000 m² land near the old amusement park in Karbala, 4 kilometers from the shrine of Imam Hussein. This allowed a wider expansion for the university and saw the opening of more faculties.

The university seeks to raise the level of education up to that of developed countries in terms of scientific sobriety and to achieve quantum leaps in performance levels and reach international standards.

Faculties 

 Faculty of Law 
 Faculty of Arts 
 Faculty of Islamic Sciences
Faculty of Pharmacy
Faculty of Medical & Health Technologies
Faculty of Dentistry

See also 
 List of universities in Iraq

References

External links
Official website

Universities in Iraq
Karbala
Educational institutions established in 2003
2003 establishments in Iraq